Following their championship winning campaign in League One last season, Charlton Athletic's 2012–13 campaign was their first back in the Championship since the 2008–09 season.

League table

Players

Squad statistics

Appearances and goals

|}

Top scorers

Disciplinary record

Coaching staff

Boardroom

Results

Pre-season

Championship

Club Standings

Round-by-Round results

League Cup

FA Cup

Transfers

In

Out

Loan in

Loan out

References

Notes

Charlton Athletic F.C. seasons
Charlton Athletic F.C.